Superbird-C2, known as Superbird-7 before launch, is a geostationary communications satellite operated by JSAT Corporation and designed and manufactured by Mitsubishi Electric on the DS2000 satellite bus. Its payload is composed of 28 Ku-band transponders with a total bandwidth of 828 MHz.

It was originally ordered by Space Communications Corporation (SCC), but it was later merged and absorbed by JSAT Corporation. By the time of the actual launch it was a fully used Superbird-C2 as a replacement for Superbird-C to provide communications services to Japan, East Asia and the Pacific Ocean.

History 
In April 2005, Space Communications Corporation (SCC) issued an Request for proposal (RFP) for Superbird-7, a spacecraft destined to replace the aging Superbird-C. On 28 June 2005, Mitsubishi Electric (MELCO) got first contract negotiations right, and on31 October 2005, SCC and MELCO successfully concluded the contract negotiation. On 1 November 2005, SCC makes the orders to MELCO official for the first commercial communications satellite to be built in Japan, the Superbird-7. The contract called for on orbit delivery, with MELCO handling every detail from construction to launch procurement and on orbit testing for final hand over to the customer. It was not only the first SCC order for a commercial communications satellite built in Japan, but the first such order ever. This event meant that MELCO officially entered the market.

It was going to be renamed as Superbird-C2 once in orbit and be stationed on the 144° East where it would replace the aging Superbird-C. It was expected to offer its services in Japan, Eastern Asia and the Pacific Ocean.

In March 2008, SCC becomes a fully owned subsidiary of SKY Perfect JSAT Group. On the SKY Perfect JSAT board meeting of 6 August 2008, it was resolved to merge SKY Perfect Communications, JSAT Corporation and Space Communications Corporation. The merger would see SKY Perfect absorb JSAT and SCC and both legacy companies dissolved. Thus, by the time of launch, Superbird-7 was a JSAT spacecraft.

Superbird-7 was successfully launched along AMC-21 by an Ariane 5 ECA on 14 August 2008, at 20:44 UTC. It separated from the spacecraft at 21:09 UTC and less than an hour later, at 22:03 UTC, it had already spread its solar panels. After the successful launch, Superbird-7 was renamed as Superbird-C2.

On 17 October 2008, MELCO announced that they had performed the final handover of the spacecraft to JSAT. They had performed all orbital maneuvers to its correct orbital slot on the 144° East position, had completed the on-orbit tests and performed the necessary acceptance tests. This concluded the commission phase and the spacecraft was put into service.

On 1 August 2012, JSAT and Panasonic Avionics Corporation announced an agreement for under which Panasonic would commit to use the Superbird-C2 beams for its eXConnect in-flight Internet connectivity service in South East Asia.

See also 

 DS2000 – The satellite bus on which Superbird-C2 is based
 SKY PerfecTV! – Satellite TV division of the same owner corporation and major user of Superbird-C2

References 

Communications satellites in geostationary orbit
Spacecraft launched in 2008
Satellites using the DS2000 bus
Mitsubishi Electric products, services and standards
Communications satellites of Japan
2008 in Japan